Lure Riga (Latvian: Lure Rīga) was a football club from Riga, Latvia. It was active while Latvia was under German control and its squad consisted only of German players.

Lure Riga competed in the 1944 Latvian Higher League tournament and was ranked sixth out of eight teams after seven matches, with 3 points and 12:17 goals. Due to the invasion of the Soviet Red Army the season could not be finished and the German team Lure Riga ceased to exist.

It is not known when the club has been established (although it may have been after the Germans gaining control over Latvia) but it is obvious it has been banned in 1944 by the Soviet government.

Defunct football clubs in Latvia